Françoise Seigner (7 April 1928 – 13 October 2008) was a French actress. She is best known for her theatre work, but also acted in a few movies, such as The Wild Child (1970) and the 2005 adaptation of the Agatha Christie novel By the Pricking of My Thumbs (2005). She was the aunt of actresses Emmanuelle and Mathilde Seigner.

Seigner died of pancreatic cancer.

Filmography

References

External links

French stage actresses
French film actresses
French television actresses
Deaths from pancreatic cancer
Officers of the Ordre national du Mérite
Sociétaires of the Comédie-Française
1928 births
2008 deaths
20th-century French actresses
21st-century French actresses
French National Academy of Dramatic Arts alumni